Chloroleucon eurycyclum is a species of flowering plant in the family Fabaceae. It is found only in Venezuela.

References

eurycyclum
Flora of Venezuela
Vulnerable plants
Taxonomy articles created by Polbot